Crowley Island is an island between the West River and the Indian River in Addison, Washington County, Maine. Crowley Island is connected to the mainland by a bridge and Crowley Island Road.  There is also a cemetery on the island. Steele Point is located on the south west tip of the island.

References

Islands of Washington County, Maine